Elizabeth Paris may refer to:
 Elizabeth Paris (Withchblade), fictional character
Elizabeth Crewson Paris, American judge